NGC 213 is a spiral galaxy located in the constellation Pisces. It was discovered on October 14, 1784, by William Herschel.

References

0213
0436
Barred spiral galaxies
Pisces (constellation)
002469